The Barbarian Rugby Club, more commonly known as the French Barbarians, is a rugby union team formed in 1979 and based in France. It was founded as an amateur invitational team modeled on the Barbarian F.C.

From the start of the 2017–18 season, the French Barbarians became the official second national team of the French Rugby Federation, which had previously designated either the France U20 side or France A as that team.

The French Barbarians play in sky, navy and royal blue hooped jerseys. As with the original Barbarians, players retain the socks from their "home" club strip.

History
Jean-Claude Skrela founded the club after he had played for, and adored, the original Barbarians in the later days of his career.  Through the amateur era, all players chosen for the side were either French or played for French clubs.

One of the most recent matches was against the Argentina national team (Los Pumas) in early 2007, as part of their preparation for the 2007 Rugby World Cup. For the game, held in Biarritz, the coaches were Jacques Delmas (Biarritz), Patrice Lagisquet (Biarritz) and were captained by Thomas Lièvremont. While in 2008 they beat Canada in Victoria. They played with Argentina at José Amalfitani Stadium in Buenos Aires on 20 June 2009 as part of the mid-year test series, and lost 32–18.

In 2016 the French Barbarians beat Australia XV by 19–11 in their first match against an Australian side for over twenty years. And in late 2017 they beat the Māori All Blacks 19–15 in the Autumn internationals, which was the first time playing that side.

Matches against international sides

Overall

Current squad
French Barbarians squad to face the United States on 1 July 2022 as part of the 2022 mid-year rugby union tests.

Coaches:  Christian Labit and  Kevin Gourdon

Note: Bold denotes players that have represented the French Barbarians in previous matches. Italics represents uncapped players.

Former players
 
  Malik Hamadache
  Miguel Avramovic
  Lucas Borges
  Mauricio Reggiardo
  Alberto Vernet Basualdo
  David Campese
  John Eales
  Nick Farr-Jones
  James O'Connor
  George Smith
  Robins Tchale-Watchou
  Mike James
  Silvère Tian
  Richard Pool-Jones
  Peter Winterbottom
  Rupeni Caucaunibuca
  Waisale Serevi
  Marika Vunibaka
  Louis Armary
  David Aucagne
  Teddy Baubigny
  Alexi Balès
  Pierre-Louis Barassi
  Abdelatif Benazzi
  Philippe Benetton
  Pierre Berbizier
  Philippe Bernat-Salles
  Serge Betsen
  Serge Blanco
  Éric Bonneval
  Olivier Brouzet
  Nicolas Brusque
  Laurent Cabannes
  Jean-Marie Cadieu
  Didier Camberabero
  Louis Carbonel
  Alain Carminati
  Thomas Castaignède
  Richard Castel
  Marc Cécillon
  Denis Charvet
  Gérard Cholley
  Vincent Clerc
  Didier Codorniou
  Franck Comba
  Jean Condom
  Jean-Jacques Crenca
  Dylan Cretin
  Marc Dal Maso
  Marc de Rougemont
  Christophe Deylaud
  Philippe Dintrans
  Christophe Dominici
  Yves Donguy
  Pierre Dospital
  Michel Droitecourt
  Daniel Dubroca
  Jean-Baptiste Élissalde
  Jean-Pierre Élissalde
  Dominique Erbani
  Jérôme Fillol
  Jacques Fouroux
  Fabien Galthié
  Xavier Garbajosa
  Jean-Pierre Garuet-Lempirou
  Stéphane Glas
  Arthur Gomes
  Jean-Michel Gonzalez
  Antoine Guillamon
  Francis Haget
  Dominique Harize
  Cédric Heymans
  Aubin Hueber
  Jean-François Imbernon
  Jean-Luc Joinel
  Jordan Joseph
  Jean-Baptiste Lafond
  Patrice Lagisquet
  Guy Laporte
  Christophe Laussucq
  Jean-Patrick Lescarboura
  Marc Lièvremont
  Thomas Lièvremont
  Sylvain Marconnet
  Jimmy Marlu
  Tony Marsh
  Rémy Martin
  Olivier Merle
  Franck Mesnel
  Frédéric Michalak
  Vincent Moscato
  Émile Ntamack
  Romain Ntamack
  Pascal Ondarts
  Alain Paco
  Michel Palmié
  Boris Palu
  Robert Paparemborde
  Laurent Pardo
  Adrien Pélissié
  Fabien Pelous
  Jean-Baptiste Poux
  Thibaut Privat
  Pierre Rabadan
  Swan Rebbadj
  Arthur Retière
  Jean-Pierre Rives
  Laurent Rodriguez
  Jean-Pierre Romeu
  Aurélien Rougerie
  Olivier Roumat
  Philippe Saint-André
  Jean-Luc Sadourny
  Philippe Sella
  David Skrela
  Jean-Claude Skrela
  Cédric Soulette
  Jérôme Thion
  Jean-François Tordo
  Diego Domínguez
  Hugo MacNeill
  Fergus Slattery
  Ian Jones
  Josh Kronfeld
  Simon Mannix
  Chris Masoe
  David Smith
  Grzegorz Kacała
  Naas Botha
  Brett Gosper
  Filipo Toala

Honours

 Melrose Sevens
 Champions (1): 1983

See also

Australian Barbarians
Brussels Barbarians
Fiji Barbarians
New Zealand Barbarians
South African Barbarians

References

External links
 Official Website

Barbarian F.C.
International rugby union teams
Barbarians
Rugby clubs established in 1979
1979 establishments in France